The Catechetical School of Antioch was one of the two major centers of the study of biblical exegesis and theology during Late Antiquity; the other was the Catechetical School of Alexandria. This group was known by this name because the advocates of this tradition were based in the city of Antioch, one of the major cities of the ancient Roman Empire. 

While the Christian intellectuals of Alexandria emphasized the allegorical interpretation of Scriptures and tended toward a Christology that emphasized the union of the human and the divine, those in Antioch held to a more literal and occasionally typological exegesis and a Christology that emphasized the distinction between the human and the divine in the person of Jesus Christ.

The school in general tended to what might be called, in a rather loose sense, an Adoptionist Christology. Nestorius, before becoming Patriarch of Constantinople, had also been a monk at Antioch and had there become imbued with the principles of the Antiochene theological school.

Periods

The school of Antioch is best divided into three periods:

The early school (170-early fourth century)
The earliest author known of this period is Theophilus of Antioch. Then there is a gap of a century and in the first half of the fourth century there are three known antiochene authors: the best known is Eusebius of Emesa; other representatives are Acacius of Caesarea and Theodore bishop of Heraklea.

The middle school (350-433)
This period includes at least three different generations: Diodorus of Tarsus, who directed an ἀσκητήριον (school) he may have founded. Among his disciples, the best known are John Chrysostom and Theodore of Mopsuestia. The main figure of the third generation was Nestorius.

The late school (after 433)
After the Council of Ephesus (431), the School of Antioch lost some of its prestige. However, after the Council of Chalcedon (451), the Antiochian school became the sole theological school within Eastern and Western Christianity, where the Oriental Orthodox adopted the Alexandrian School of Theology. Apparently only two later authors are known: Basil of Seleucia and Gennadius of Constantinople.

See also
 School of Edessa
 School of Nisibis
 School of Seleucia-Ctesiphon
 Early Christianity
 Nestorianism
 Catechetical School of Alexandria - A school that was seen in opposition to it in early Christological debates

References

Sources 

 
 
 
 
 
 
 
 
  
 
 
 
 
 
 
   

Ancient Christian controversies
Christian organizations established in the 2nd century
Christian terminology
Philosophical schools and traditions
Hellenistic civilization
Biblical exegesis
2nd-century establishments in the Roman Empire
Christian schools